Yolağzı (literally "mouth of the road" in Turkish) may refer to the following places in Turkey:

 Yolağzı, Ardanuç, a village in the district of Ardanuç, Artvin Province
 Yolağzı, Batman, a village in the district of Batman, Batman Province
 Yolağzı, Bitlis, a village
 Yolağzı, Eceabat
 Yolağzı, Gercüş, a village in the district of Gercüş, Batman Province
 Yolağzı, Posof, a village in the district of Posof, Ardahan Province